Moumine Kassouré Ekiang (born 23 March 1989) is a Chadian professional football goalkeeper. He has made one appearance for the Chad national football team.

See also
 List of Chad international footballers

References

External links
 

1989 births
Living people
Chadian footballers
Chad international footballers
People from Chari-Baguirmi Region
Association football goalkeepers